Abeysinghe Arachchilage Wijethunga (born 16 November 1957) is a Sri Lankan politician. He is a Member of the Parliament of Sri Lanka and former member of the  Sabaragamuwa Provincial Council, Ratnapura District UNP Organizer and chief Organizer Kalawana.

References

Living people
United National Party politicians
1957 births
Members of the 12th Parliament of Sri Lanka
Members of the 15th Parliament of Sri Lanka
Provincial councillors of Sri Lanka
Members of the Sabaragamuwa Provincial Council